In 1889, Edward Frederick Knight sailed to Trindade in a 64-foot yawl named the Alerte.  He wrote the book The Cruise of the Alerte about his journey with detailed descriptions of Trindade.

Arthur Ransome used the descriptions from Knight's book as a basis for Crab Island in his book Peter Duck, except that he set the island further north in the Caribbean Sea.

External links

1890 non-fiction books
Travel autobiographies
Espírito Santo
British travel books
English non-fiction books
British autobiographies